Ali Ahmad Ali Mohammed Al-Wehaibi (Arabic: علي أحمد علي محمد الوهيبي; born 27 October 1983) is a former Emirati footballer. He last played as a midfielder for Al Ain.

Al-Wehaibi also played for and captained the United Arab Emirates national football team.

Honours 
Al Ain:
 UAE Pro League: 2002/2003, 2003/2004
 UAE President's Cup: 2004/2005, 2005/2006, 2008/2009
 UAE FA Cup: 2004/2005, 2005/2006
 AFC Champions League: 2002–03
 UAE Super Cup 2002/2003, 2009/2010
 Etisalat Emirates Cup 2008/2009

Career statistics 
As of 28 September 2009

Club 

1
2

External links

1983 births
Living people
Emirati footballers
Association football midfielders
Al Ain FC players
2011 AFC Asian Cup players
UAE Pro League players
United Arab Emirates international footballers